Nicole Louise Reinhart (June 3, 1976 – September 17, 2000) was an American professional track and road racing cyclist who twice won gold medals in cycling at the Pan American Games.

Early life
Reinhart grew up in Macungie, Pennsylvania in the Lehigh Valley region of the state. She was a nine-time USA Cycling Junior (18 and under) national champion. As a student at Pennsylvania's Emmaus High School in Emmaus, Pennsylvania, she won three U.S. fitness championships and excelled on Emmaus's cross-country and track teams in the highly competitive East Penn Conference.

Pan American Games and other championships
After graduating from Emmaus High School in 1994, Reinhart focused on cycling and won two national élite track championships and two gold medals at the Pan American Games. In 1999, she signed for Saturn Women's Professional Cycling Team and won nine races that year, followed by another 13 in 2000.

Death
On September 17, 2000, Reinhart was killed during a 42-mile circuit race held on a 3.5-mile course in Arlington, Massachusetts.  Her left pedal and foot hit a concrete curb, and she was thrown from her bicycle and struck a tree.  (The accident that killed Wouter Weylandt in May 2011 happened in almost precisely the same manner.)  The event was the last of four races comprising the 2000 BMC Software Cycling Grand Prix.  She had won the previous three; the organizers offered $250,000 to any rider who won all four.  The prize was donated to her family, who established the Nicole Reinhart Foundation in Macungie, Pennsylvania in her honor. A park or playground at the Cutter School in Arlington, Massachusetts was named in her honor as a memorial, and dedicated in 2001.

In 2004, Reinhart was inducted posthumously into the Lehigh Valley Velodrome Hall of Fame in Breinigsville, Pennsylvania.

Major cycling achievements
2000 – Saturn Women's Professional Cycling Team
1st Clarendon Cup
1st – BMC Software Tour of San Jose (San Jose, California)
1st – BMC Software Tour of Houston (Houston, Texas)
1st – BMC Software Downtown Criterium (Austin, Texas)
1st, Prologue – Redlands Bicycle Classic
3rd – Women's 25 km points race, U.S. Olympic Track Trials

1999 – Saturn Women's Professional Cycling Team
1st Clarendon Cup
1st, Stage 3 (25-mile criterium) – Redlands Bicycle Classic
3rd, Prologue – Redlands Bicycle Classic
10th – Sea Otter Classic - Final General Classification
 10th – Sea Otter Classic (Robert Talbott Pro/Elite Circuit Race)
 20th – Sea Otter Classic (Robert Talbott Pro/Elite Time Trial)
 38th – Sea Otter Classic (Robert Talbott Pro/Elite Road Stage Race)
1998
1st, Prologue – Redlands Bicycle Classic
1st, Women's 3 km Scratch Race – EDS Spring Classic
1st, Women's Miss and Out – EDS Spring Classic
3rd, Women's 500 m Sprint – UCI World Track Cup

1997
1st, Women's 500 m Sprint – EDS Track Cup
1st, Women's Points Race – EDS Track Cup
Quarterfinals, Women's Match Sprint – UCI World Track Cup

1996
1st, Women's 500 m Sprint – Pan American Championships
1st, Road race – Pan American Championships

1994
17-18 2000m TT –  Junior Women Track Champion
17-18 Criterium –  Junior Women Road Champion
1993
17-18 Points Race –  Junior Women Track Champion
17-18 Sprints –  Junior Women Track Champion
17-18 Criterium –  Junior Women Road Champion
1992
15-16 Omnium –  Junior Women Track Champion
15-16 Criterium –  Junior Women Road Champion
15-16 Road –  Junior Women Road Champion

U.S. national records 
11.666 seconds – Junior Women Track Time Trial Flying Start (200 m), Quito, Ecuador, July 26, 1994 (since broken).

References

External links 
 
 "Cycling & Faith" at Good Spin
 Nicole Reinhart biography at WEPan

1976 births
2000 deaths
20th-century American women
American female cyclists
American track cyclists
Cyclists from Pennsylvania
Cyclists who died while racing
Emmaus High School alumni
Sports deaths in Massachusetts
Sportspeople from Lehigh County, Pennsylvania